Master Vishal Krishna (born 5 October 2004) is an Indian child actor in the Malayalam film Industry. Vishal made his debut in Maalgudi Days (2015), in which he played the role of a 9-year old boy named Milan. He won Best Child Artist at the 2015 Kerala Film Critics Association Awards 2015.

In 2016, he took part in the Movie named Annmariya Kalippilaanu directed by Midhun Manuel Thomas. In 2017 he played the role of Eric in Ranjan Pramod's Rakshadhikari Baiju Oppu and portrayed Sethumadhavan as a child in Sajid Yahiya's Mohanlal starring Manju Warrier and Indrajith Sukumaran.

Personal life 
Vishal was born on 5 October 2004 to Sunil K.R and Ambika K.P in Vyttila, Kerala. He attends Chinmaya Vidyalaya, Tripunithura.

Filmography

Awards 
 Best child artist - Kerala Film Critics Association Awards 2015.

References

External links 
 

2004 births
21st-century Indian male child actors
Living people
Male actors in Malayalam cinema
Indian male film actors